The Chrysler A57 Multibank is a 30-cylinder  engine that was created in 1941 as America entered World War II. It consists of five banks of inline-6 cylinder engines.  It was born out of the necessity for a rear-mounted tank engine to be developed and produced in the shortest time possible for use in  the M3A4 Lee medium tank and its successor M4A4 Sherman medium tank.  Each had lengthened hulls to accommodate the A57.

In order to use existing tooling, five  Chrysler flathead engines (bore , stroke ) were arranged around a central shaft, producing a unique 30-cylinder  engine in a relatively compact but heavy package.

The combined assembly consisted of five of these straight-six engines mounted in a pseudo-radial fashion upon a central cast-iron crankcase. The arrangement employed a common radiator, water pump, oil pan & dual oil pumps, with each of the five component crankshafts fitted with a geared flywheel that meshed with a central sun gear that drove a main shaft running through the central crankcase.

This large engine assembly necessitated a longer hull (same as the M4A6), becoming the M4A4; most of these were supplied to Allied countries under Lend-Lease.

In the February 1944 issue of the magazine Popular Science,  an advertisement by Chrysler claimed the A57 could still move the tank it was fitted in even if 12 out of its 30 cylinders were knocked out.

A total of 109 Lees and 7,499 Shermans were fitted with the A57.  The M4A4 was largely supplied to the British, the US preferring the M4A3 with the more conventional Ford GAA V8 engine, and restricting their M4A4s to overseas use.

Museum display
The engine was preserved at the Walter P. Chrysler Museum in America and at the Imperial War Museum Duxford in the United Kingdom. The Tank Museum in Dorset, England has a complete A57.  That museum also acquired a second engine without radiator in 2019, from the UK Defence Academy at Shrivenham. Both are currently in storage in the museum's Conservation Centre.

References

External links
The Chrysler A57 Multi-Bank Engine - An amazing engine by Julian Edgar of AutoSpeed.

A57 multibank
Collection of Walter P. Chrysler Museum
Radial engines
M4 Sherman tanks